Clarence Everett Howard (September 7, 1859 - May 2, 1930), or C. E. Howard, was an American politician, who was the fifteenth Mayor of Orlando in 1902. He served after Mayor James B. Parramore died in office.

References

Mayors of Orlando, Florida
1859 births
1930 deaths